Lim Seng Hoo (born 1956) is a Singaporean chess player, who was awarded the title International Master by FIDE in 1978. He won the Singaporean Chess Championship in 1975, 1976, 1977 and 1978 and represented Singapore two times in the Asian Team Chess Championship (1977 and 1974).

References

External links
 
 
 Lim Seng Hoo games at 365Chess.com

1956 births
Living people
Chess International Masters
Singaporean chess players
Singaporean sportspeople of Chinese descent
Date of birth missing (living people)
20th-century Singaporean people